The 1961–62 season was Dinamo București's 13th season in Divizia A. Dinamo won their second championship, ending the season with 36 points, three more than the second ranked, Petrolul Ploieşti. Gheorghe Ene is again ranked in the top three leading scorers, with 19 goals.

The success came in spite of the manager changes: Traian Ionescu managed the team in the first part of the championship, Constantin Teaşcă replaced him in the beginning of the second part and Dumitru Nicolae "Nicuşor" ended the season.

Results

Squad 

Goalkeepers: Ilie Datcu (20 / 0); Iuliu Uțu (8 / 0).
Defenders: Cornel Popa (24 / 0); Ion Nunweiller (26 / 3); Dumitru Ivan (26 / 0); Nicolae Panait (1 / 0).
Midfielders:  Ilie Constantinescu (11 / 0); Vasile Alexandru (15 / 3); Lică Nunweiller (18 / 0); Constantin Ștefan (16 / 0); Mircea Stoenescu (1 / 0).
Forwards: Ion Pîrcălab (24 / 7); Constantin Frățilă (19 / 5); Gheorghe Ene (20 / 19); Ion Țîrcovnicu (20 / 5); Iosif Varga (15 / 4); Haralambie Eftimie (16 / 11); Constantin David (20 / 4); Tănase Dumitrescu (1 / 0); Aurel Unguroiu (5 / 0); Vasile Anghel (5 / 0).
(league appearances and goals listed in brackets)

Manager: Traian Ionescu / Constantin Teașcă / Nicolae Dumitru.

Transfers 

The main transfers made by Dinamo were Ion Pîrcălab (from UTA), Aurel Unguroiu (from CSMS Iaşi). Debuts: Ilie Datcu, Constantin Ştefan. Gheorghe Cosma (to Progresul), Mircea Sasu and Selymesi (both to UTA) left Dinamo.

References 

 www.labtof.ro
 www.romaniansoccer.ro

1961
Association football clubs 1961–62 season
Dinamo
1961